Education is a purposeful activity directed at achieving certain aims, such as transmitting knowledge or fostering skills and character traits. These aims may include the development of understanding, rationality, kindness, and honesty. Various researchers emphasize the role of critical thinking in order to distinguish education from indoctrination. Some theorists require that education results in an improvement of the student while others prefer a value-neutral definition of the term. In a slightly different sense, education may also refer, not to the process, but to the product of this process: the mental states and dispositions possessed by educated people. Education originated as the transmission of cultural heritage from one generation to the next. Today, educational goals increasingly encompass new ideas such as the liberation of learners, skills needed for modern society, empathy, and complex vocational skills.

Types of education are commonly divided into formal, non-formal, and informal education. Formal education takes place in education and training institutions, is usually structured by curricular aims and objectives, and learning is typically guided by a teacher. In most regions, formal education is compulsory up to a certain age and commonly divided into educational stages such as kindergarten, primary school and secondary school. Nonformal education occurs as addition or alternative to formal education. It may be structured according to educational arrangements, but in a more flexible manner, and usually takes place in community-based, workplace-based or civil society-based settings. Lastly, informal education occurs in daily life, in the family, any experience that has a formative effect on the way one thinks, feels, or acts may be considered educational, whether unintentional or intentional. In practice there is a continuum from the highly formalized to the highly informalized, and informal learning can occur in all three settings. For instance, homeschooling can be classified as nonformal or informal, depending upon the structure.

Regardless of setting, educational methods include teaching, training, storytelling, discussion, and directed research. The methodology of teaching is called pedagogy. Education is supported by a variety of different philosophies, theories and empirical research agendas.

There are movements for education reforms, such as for improving quality and efficiency of education towards relevance in students' lives and efficient problem solving in modern or future society at large, or for evidence-based education methodologies. A right to education has been recognized by some governments and the United Nations. For example, 24 January is the International Day of Education. At UN - level, several observance years and decades have been dedicated to education, such as 
1970 International Education Year. Education is also one of the 17 Global Goals, where global initiatives aim at achieving Sustainable Development Goal 4, which promotes quality education for all.

Definitions 

Numerous definitions of education have been suggested by theorists belonging to diverse fields. Many agree that education is a purposeful activity directed at achieving certain aims, especially the transmission of knowledge. But they often include other aims as well, such as fostering skills and character traits. However, there are deep disagreements about the exact nature of education besides these general characteristics. According to some conceptions, it is primarily a process that occurs during events like schooling, teaching, and learning. Others understand it not as a process but as the achievement or product brought about by this process. On this view, education is what educated persons have, i.e. the mental states and dispositions that are characteristic of them. However, the term may also refer to the academic study of the methods and processes taking place during teaching and learning, as well as the social institutions involved in these processes. Etymologically, the word "education" is derived from the Latin word ēducātiō ("A breeding, a bringing up, a rearing") from ēducō ("I educate, I train") which is related to the homonym ēdūcō ("I lead forth, I take out; I raise up, I erect") from ē- ("from, out of") and dūcō ("I lead, I conduct").

Some researchers, like R. S. Peters, have proposed precise definitions by spelling out the necessary and sufficient conditions of education, for example: (1) it is concerned with the transmission of knowledge and understanding; (2) this transmission is worthwhile and (3) done in a morally appropriate manner in tune with the student's interests. This and similar attempts are often successful at characterizing the most paradigmatic forms of education but have received numerous criticisms nonetheless, usually in the form of specific counterexamples for which the proposed criteria fail. These difficulties have led various theorists to develop less precise conceptions based on family resemblance. This means that all the different forms of education are similar to each other even though they need not share an essential set of features characteristic of all of them. This view can also be combined with the idea that the meaning of the term "education" is context-dependent and may thus vary depending on the situation in which it is used. Having a clear idea of what the term means is important for various issues: it is needed to identify and coherently talk about it as well as to determine how to achieve and measure it.

There is disagreement in the academic literature on whether education is an evaluative concept. So-called thick definitions affirm this, for example, by holding that an improvement of the learner is a necessary requirement of education. However, different thick definitions may still disagree among themselves on what constitutes such an improvement. Thin definitions, on the other hand, try to give a value-neutral account of education. A closely related distinction is that between descriptive and prescriptive conceptions. Descriptive conceptions aim to describe how the term is actually used by regular speakers while prescriptive conceptions try to express what good education is or how it should be done.

Many thick and prescriptive conceptions base their account on the aims of education, i.e. regarding the goals that the activity of education tries to achieve. These aims are sometimes categorized into epistemic goods, like knowledge and understanding, skills, like rationality and critical thinking, and character traits, like kindness and honesty. Some theorists focus on one overarching purpose of education and see the more specific aims as means to this end. This can take the form of socialization, in which accumulated knowledge is transmitted from one generation to the next with the goal of helping the student function as a regular citizen in society. More person-centered definitions focus on the well-being of the student instead: education is to help them lead a good life or the life they wish to lead. Various researchers emphasize critical thinking as an aim in order to distinguish education from indoctrination. This is motivated by the idea that mere indoctrination is only interested in instilling beliefs in the student without concern for their evidential status. Education, on the other hand, should also foster the rational ability to critically reflect on those beliefs and question them. However, some theorists contend that certain forms of indoctrination may be necessary in the early stages of education until the child's mind is sufficiently developed.

Education can be characterized from the teacher's or the student's perspective. Teacher-centered definitions focus on the perspective and role of the teacher, for example, in the form of transmitting knowledge and skills while doing so in a morally appropriate manner. Student-centered definitions, on the other hand, outline education based on the student's experience in the learning process, for example, based on how education transforms and enriches their subsequent experience. However, conceptualizations taking both perspectives into account are also possible. This can take the form of describing the process as the shared experience of a common world that involves discovery as well as posing and solving problems.

Types 
Education is commonly subdivided into different types. The most common subdivision is between formal, non-formal, and informal education. However, some theorists only distinguish between formal and informal education. A process of teaching constitutes formal education if it happens in a complex institutionalized framework. Such frameworks are usually chronologically and hierarchically organized as in modern schooling systems, which have different classes based on the student's age and progress, all the way from primary school to university. Because of its scale, formal education is usually controlled and guided by a governmental entity and is normally compulsory up to a certain age. Non-formal and informal education differ from formal education due to their lack of such a governmental institutionalized framework. Non-formal education constitutes a middle ground in the sense that it is also organized, systematic, and carried out with a clear purpose in mind, such as tutoring, fitness classes, or the scouting movement. Informal education, on the other hand, happens in an unsystematic way through daily experiences and exposure to the environment. Unlike formal and non-formal education, there is usually no designated authority figure responsible for teaching. Informal education is present in many different settings and happens throughout one's life, mostly in a spontaneous manner. This is how children usually learn their mother tongue from their parents or when learning how to prepare a certain dish by cooking together. Some accounts tie the difference between the three types mainly to the location where the learning takes place: in school for formal education, in places of the individual's day-to-day routine for informal education, and in other places occasionally visited for non-formal education. It has been argued that the motivation responsible for formal education is predominantly extrinsic, whereas it tends to be mainly intrinsic for non-formal and informal education. The distinction between the three types is normally clear for the paradigmatic cases but there are various intermediate forms of education that do not easily fall into one category.

Formal education plays a central role in modern civilization. But in primitive cultures, most of the education happens not on the formal but on the informal level. This usually means that there is no distinction between activities focused on education and other activities. Instead, the whole environment may be seen as a form of school and many or all adults may act as teachers. An important reason for moving to formal forms of education is due to the sheer quantity of knowledge to be passed on, which requires both a formal setting and well-trained teachers to be transmitted effectively. A side effect of the process of formalization is that the educational experience becomes more abstract and more removed from daily life. In this regard, more emphasis is put on grasping general patterns instead of observing and imitating particular behavior.

Closely related to the distinction between formal and informal education is that between conscious education, which is done with a clear purpose in mind, and unconscious education, which occurs on its own without being consciously planned or guided. This may happen in part through the personality of teachers and adults by having indirect effects on the development of the student's personality. Another categorization depends on the age group of the learners and includes childhood education, adolescent education, adult education, and elderly education. The distinction can also be based on the subject, encompassing fields like science education, language education, art education, religious education, and physical education. The educational methodology may be used as well for classifications, such as the difference between the traditional teacher-centered education, in which the teacher takes the center stage in providing students with information, in contrast to student-centered education, in which students take on a more active and responsible role in shaping the classroom activities. The term "alternative education" is sometimes used for a wide range of educational methods and approaches outside mainstream pedagogy, for example, like the emphasis on narration and storytelling found in indigenous education or autodidacticism. Forms of education can also be categorized by the medium used, for example, as distance education, like online education, e-learning, or m-learning, in contrast to regular classroom or onsite education. Various types of online education take the form of open education, where the courses and materials are made available with a minimal amount of barriers. Another classification is based on the social institution responsible for education and may include categories for institutions like family, school, civil society, state, and church. When the term education is used in the sense of an achievement or a product, expressions like type or level of education refer to the person's academic or professional qualification, such as high school completion, bachelor's degree, master's degree, doctor's degree, or degrees in vocational training.

Formal

Formal education occurs in a structured environment whose explicit purpose is teaching students. Usually, formal education takes place in a school environment with classrooms of multiple students learning together with a trained, certified teacher of the subject. It can be subdivided into various categories or levels. The International Standard Classification of Education (ISCED) was created by UNESCO as a statistical base to compare education systems. In 1997, it defined seven levels of education and 25 fields, though the fields were later separated out to form a different project. The current version ISCED 2011 has nine rather than seven levels, created by dividing the tertiary pre-doctorate level into three levels. It also extended the lowest level (ISCED 0) to cover a new sub-category of early childhood educational development programs, which target children below the age of three years.

Early childhood

Education designed to support early development in preparation for participation in school and society. The programmes are designed for children below the age of three. This is ISCED level 01. Preschools provide education from ages approximately three to seven, depending on the country when children enter primary education. The children now readily interact with their peers and the educator. These are also known as nursery schools and as kindergarten, except in the US, where the term kindergarten refers to the earliest levels of primary education. Kindergarten "provides a child-centred, preschool curriculum for three- to seven-year-old children that aim[s] at unfolding the child's physical, intellectual, and moral nature with balanced emphasis on each of them." This is ISCED level 02.

Primary

This is ISCED level 1. Primary (or elementary) education consists of the first four to seven years of formal, structured education. In general, primary education consists of six to eight years of schooling starting at the age of five to seven, although this varies between, and sometimes within, countries. Globally, in 2008, around 89% of children aged six to twelve were enrolled in primary education, and this proportion was rising. Under the Education For All programs driven by UNESCO, most countries have committed to achieving universal enrollment in primary education by 2015, and in many countries, it is compulsory. The division between primary and secondary education is quite arbitrary, but it generally occurs at about eleven or twelve years of age. Some education systems have separate middle schools, with the transition to the final stage of secondary education taking place at around the age of fifteen. Schools that provide primary education, are mostly referred to as primary schools or elementary schools. Primary schools are often subdivided into infant schools and junior schools.

In India, for example, compulsory education spans over twelve years, with eight years of elementary education, five years of primary schooling and three years of upper primary schooling. Various states in the republic of India provide 12 years of compulsory school education based on a national curriculum framework designed by the National Council of Educational Research and Training.

Secondary

This covers the two ISCED levels, ISCED 2: Lower Secondary Education and ISCED 3: Upper Secondary Education.

In most contemporary educational systems of the world, secondary education comprises the formal education that occurs during adolescence. In the United States, Canada, and Australia, primary and secondary education together are sometimes referred to as K-12 education, and in New Zealand Year 1–13 is used. The purpose of secondary education can be to give common knowledge, to ensure literacy, to prepare for higher education, or to train directly in a profession.

Secondary education in the United States did not emerge until 1910, with the rise of large corporations and advancing technology in factories, which required skilled workers. In order to meet this new job demand, high schools were created, with a curriculum focused on practical job skills that would better prepare students for white collar or skilled blue collar work. This proved beneficial for both employers and employees, since the improved human capital lowered costs for the employer, while skilled employees received higher wages.

Secondary education has a longer history in Europe, where grammar schools or academies date from as early as the sixth century,  in the form of public schools, fee-paying schools, or charitable educational foundations, which themselves date even further back.

It spans the period between the typically universal compulsory primary education to the optional, selective tertiary, "postsecondary", or "higher" education of ISCED 5 and 6 (e.g. university), and the ISCED 4 Further education or vocational school.

Depending on the system, schools for this period, or a part of it, may be called secondary or high schools, gymnasiums, lyceums, middle schools, colleges, or vocational schools. The exact meaning of any of these terms varies from one system to another. The exact boundary between primary and secondary education also varies from country to country and even within them but is generally around the seventh to the tenth year of schooling.

Lower
Programs at ISCED level 2, lower secondary education are usually organized around a more subject-oriented curriculum; differing from primary education. Teachers typically have
pedagogical training in the specific subjects and, more often than at ISCED level 1, a class of
students will have several teachers, each with specialized knowledge of the subjects they teach. Programmes at ISCED level 2, aim to lay the foundation for lifelong learning and human development upon introducing theoretical concepts across a broad range of subjects which can be developed in future stages. Some education systems may offer vocational education programs during ISCED level 2 providing skills relevant to employment.

Upper
Programs at ISCED level 3, or upper secondary education, are typically designed to complete the secondary education process. They lead to skills relevant to employment and the skill necessary to engage in tertiary courses. They offer students more varied, specialized and in-depth instruction. They are more differentiated, with range of options and learning streams.

Community colleges offer another option at this transitional stage of education. They provide nonresidential junior college courses to people living in a particular area.

Tertiary

Higher education, also called tertiary, third stage, or postsecondary education, is the non-compulsory educational level that follows the completion of a school such as a high school or secondary school. Tertiary education is normally taken to include undergraduate and postgraduate education, as well as vocational education and training. Colleges and universities mainly provide tertiary education. Collectively, these are sometimes known as tertiary institutions. Individuals who complete tertiary education generally receive certificates, diplomas, or academic degrees.

The ISCED distinguishes four levels of tertiary education. ISCED 6 is equivalent to a first degree, ISCED 7 is equivalent to a masters or an advanced professional qualification and ISCED 8 is an advanced research qualification, usually concluding with the submission and defence of a substantive dissertation of publishable quality based on original research. The category ISCED 5 is reserved for short-cycle courses of requiring degree level study.

Higher education typically involves work towards a degree-level or foundation degree qualification. In most developed countries, a high proportion of the population (up to 50%) now enter higher education at some time in their lives. Higher education is therefore very important to national economies, both as a significant industry in its own right and as a source of trained and educated personnel for the rest of the economy.

University education includes teaching, research, and social services activities, and it includes both the undergraduate level (sometimes referred to as tertiary education) and the graduate (or postgraduate) level (sometimes referred to as graduate school). Some universities are composed of several colleges.

One type of university education is a liberal arts education, which can be defined as a "college or university curriculum aimed at imparting broad general knowledge and developing general intellectual capacities, in contrast to a professional, vocational, or technical curriculum." Although what is known today as liberal arts education began in Europe, the term "liberal arts college" is more commonly associated with institutions in the United States such as Williams College or Barnard College.

Vocational

Vocational education is a form of education focused on direct and practical training for a specific trade or craft. Vocational education may come in the form of an apprenticeship or internship as well as institutions teaching courses such as carpentry, agriculture, engineering, medicine, architecture and the arts. Post 16 education, adult education and further education involve continued study, but a level no different from that found at upper secondary, and are grouped together as ISCED 4, post-secondary non-tertiary education.

Special

In the past, those who were disabled were often not eligible for public education. Children with disabilities were repeatedly denied an education by physicians or special tutors. These early physicians (people like Itard, Seguin, Howe, Gallaudet) set the foundation for special education today. They focused on individualized instruction and functional skills. In its early years, special education was only provided to people with severe disabilities, but more recently it has been opened to anyone who has experienced difficulty learning.

Unconventional forms

Alternative

After the public school system was widely developed beginning in the 19th century, alternative education developed in part as a reaction to perceived limitations and failings of traditional education. A broad range of educational approaches emerged, including alternative schools, self learning, homeschooling, and unschooling. Example alternative schools include Montessori schools, Waldorf schools (or Steiner schools), Friends schools, Sands School, Summerhill School, Walden's Path, The Peepal Grove School, Sudbury Valley School, Krishnamurti schools, and open classroom schools.

Charter schools are another example of alternative education, which have in the recent years grown in numbers in the US and gained greater importance in its public education system.

In time, some ideas from these experiments and paradigm challenges may be adopted as the norm in education, just as Friedrich Fröbel's approach to early childhood education in 19th-century Germany has been incorporated into contemporary kindergarten classrooms. Other influential writers and thinkers have included the Swiss humanitarian Johann Heinrich Pestalozzi; the American transcendentalists Amos Bronson Alcott, Ralph Waldo Emerson, and Henry David Thoreau; the founders of progressive education, John Dewey and Francis Parker; and educational pioneers such as Maria Montessori and Rudolf Steiner, and more recently John Caldwell Holt, Paul Goodman, Frederick Mayer, George Dennison, and Ivan Illich.

Indigenous

Indigenous education refers to the inclusion of indigenous knowledge, models, methods, and content within formal and non-formal educational systems. Often in a post-colonial context, the growing recognition and use of indigenous education methods can be a response to the erosion and loss of indigenous knowledge and language through the processes of colonialism. Furthermore, it can enable indigenous communities to "reclaim and revalue their languages and cultures, and in so doing, improve the educational success of indigenous students."

Informal learning

Informal learning is one of three forms of learning defined by the Organisation for Economic Co-operation and Development (OECD). Informal learning occurs in a variety of places, such as at home, work, and through daily interactions and shared relationships among members of society. For many learners, this includes language acquisition, cultural norms, and manners.

In informal learning, there is often a reference person, a peer or expert, to guide the learner. If learners have a personal interest in what they are informally being taught, learners tend to expand their existing knowledge and conceive new ideas about the topic being learned. For example, a museum is traditionally considered an informal learning environment, as there is room for free choice, a diverse and potentially non-standardized range of topics, flexible structures, socially rich interaction, and no externally imposed assessments.

While informal learning often takes place outside educational establishments and does not follow a specified curriculum, it can also occur within educational settings and even during formal learning situations. Educators can structure their lessons to directly use their students informal learning skills within the education setting.

In the late 19th century, education through play began to be recognized as making an important contribution to child development. In the early 20th century, the concept was broadened to include young adults but the emphasis was on physical activities. L.P. Jacks, also an early proponent of lifelong learning, described education through recreation: "A master in the art of living draws no sharp distinction between his work and his play, his labour, and his leisure, his mind and his body, his education and his recreation. He hardly knows which is which. He simply pursues his vision of excellence through whatever he is doing and leaves others to determine whether he is working or playing. To himself, he always seems to be doing both. Enough for him that he does it well." Education through recreation is the opportunity to learn in a seamless fashion through all of life's activities. The concept has been revived by the University of Western Ontario to teach anatomy to medical students.

Self-directed learning

Autodidacticism (also autodidactism) is self-directed learning. One may become an autodidact at nearly any point in one's life. Notable autodidacts include Abraham Lincoln (U.S. president), Srinivasa Ramanujan (mathematician), Michael Faraday (chemist and physicist), Charles Darwin (naturalist), Thomas Alva Edison (inventor), Tadao Ando (architect), George Bernard Shaw (playwright), Frank Zappa (composer, recording engineer, film director), and Leonardo da Vinci (engineer, scientist, mathematician).

Evidence-based

Evidence-based education is the use of well designed scientific studies to determine which education methods work best. It consists of evidence-based teaching and evidence-based learning. Evidence-based learning methods such as spaced repetition can increase rate of learning. The evidence-based education movement has its roots in the larger movement towards evidence-based-practices.

Open learning and electronic technology

Many large university institutions are now starting to offer free or almost free full courses, through open education, such as Harvard, MIT and Berkeley teaming up to form edX. Other universities offering open education are prestigious private universities such as Stanford, Princeton, Duke, Johns Hopkins, the University of Pennsylvania, and Caltech, as well as notable public universities including Tsinghua, Peking, Edinburgh, University of Michigan, and University of Virginia.

Open education has been called the biggest change in the way people learn since the printing press. Despite favourable studies on effectiveness, many people may still desire to choose traditional campus education for social and cultural reasons.

Many open universities are working to have the ability to offer students standardized testing and traditional degrees and credentials.

The conventional merit-system degree is currently not as common in open education as it is in campus universities, although some open universities do already offer conventional degrees such as the Open University in the United Kingdom. Presently, many of the major open education sources offer their own form of certificate.

Out of 182 colleges surveyed in 2009 nearly half said tuition for online courses was higher than for campus-based ones.

A 2010 meta-analysis found that online and blended educational approaches had better outcomes than methods that used solely face-to-face interaction.

Public schooling

The education sector or education system is a group of institutions (ministries of education, local educational authorities, teacher training institutions, schools, universities, etc.) whose primary purpose is to provide education to children and young people in educational settings. It involves a wide range of people (curriculum developers, inspectors, school principals, teachers, school nurses, students, etc.). These institutions can vary according to different contexts.

Schools deliver education, with support from the rest of the education system through various elements such as education policies and guidelines – to which school policies can refer – curricula and learning materials, as well as pre- and in-service teacher training programmes. The school environment – both physical (infrastructures) and psychological (school climate) – is also guided by school policies that should ensure the well-being of students when they are in school. The Organisation for Economic Co-operation and Development has found that schools tend to perform best when principals have full authority and responsibility for ensuring that students are proficient in core subjects upon graduation. They must also seek feedback from students for quality-assurance and improvement. Governments should limit themselves to monitoring student proficiency.

The education sector is fully integrated into society, through interactions with numerous stakeholders and other sectors. These include parents, local communities, religious leaders, NGOs, stakeholders involved in health, child protection, justice and law enforcement (police), media and political leadership.

The shape, methodologies, taught material – the curriculum – of formal education is decided by political decision makers along with federal agencies such as the state education agency in the United States.

History

Education began in prehistory, as adults trained the young in the knowledge and skills deemed necessary in their society. In pre-literate societies, this was achieved orally and through imitation. Story-telling passed knowledge, values, and skills from one generation to the next. As cultures began to extend their knowledge beyond skills that could be readily learned through imitation, formal education developed. Schools existed in Egypt at the time of the Middle Kingdom. 

Plato founded the Academy in Athens, the first institution of higher learning in Europe. The city of Alexandria in Egypt, established in 330 BCE, became the successor to Athens as the intellectual cradle of Ancient Greece. There, the great Library of Alexandria was built in the third century BCE. European civilizations suffered a collapse of literacy and organization following the fall of Rome in CE 476.

In China, Confucius (551–479 BCE), of the State of Lu, was the country's most influential ancient philosopher, whose educational outlook continues to influence the societies of China and neighbours like Korea, Japan, and Vietnam. Confucius gathered disciples and searched in vain for a ruler who would adopt his ideals for good governance, but his Analects were written down by followers and have continued to influence education in East Asia into the modern era.

The Aztecs had schools for the noble youths called Calmecac where they would receive rigorous religious and military training. The Aztecs also had a well-developed theory about education, which has an equivalent word in Nahuatl called tlacahuapahualiztli. It means "the art of raising or educating a person", or "the art of strengthening or bringing up men". This was a broad conceptualization of education, which prescribed that it begins at home, supported by formal schooling, and reinforced by community living. Historians cite that formal education was mandatory for everyone regardless of social class and gender. There was also the word neixtlamachiliztli, which is "the act of giving wisdom to the face." These concepts underscore a complex set of educational practices, which was oriented towards communicating to the next generation the experience and intellectual heritage of the past for the purpose of individual development and his integration into the community.

After the Fall of Rome, the Catholic Church became the sole preserver of literate scholarship in Western Europe. The church established cathedral schools in the Early Middle Ages as centres of advanced education. Some of these establishments ultimately evolved into medieval universities and forebears of many of Europe's modern universities. During the High Middle Ages, Chartres Cathedral operated the famous and influential Chartres Cathedral School. The medieval universities of Western Christendom were well-integrated across all of Western Europe, encouraged freedom of inquiry, and produced a great variety of fine scholars and natural philosophers, including Thomas Aquinas of the University of Naples, Robert Grosseteste of the University of Oxford, an early expositor of a systematic method of scientific experimentation, and Saint Albert the Great, a pioneer of biological field research. Founded in 1088, the University of Bologne is considered the first, and the oldest continually operating university.

Elsewhere during the Middle Ages, Islamic science and mathematics flourished under the Islamic caliphate which was established across the Middle East, extending from the Iberian Peninsula in the west to the Indus in the east and to the Almoravid Dynasty and Mali Empire in the south.

The Renaissance in Europe ushered in a new age of scientific and intellectual inquiry and appreciation of ancient Greek and Roman civilizations. Around 1450, Johannes Gutenberg developed a printing press, which allowed works of literature to spread more quickly. The European Age of Empires saw European ideas of education in philosophy, religion, arts and sciences spread out across the globe. Missionaries and scholars also brought back new ideas from other civilizations – as with the Jesuit China missions who played a significant role in the transmission of knowledge, science, and culture between China and Europe, translating works from Europe like Euclid's Elements for Chinese scholars and the thoughts of Confucius for European audiences. The Enlightenment saw the emergence of a more secular educational outlook in Europe. Much of modern traditional Western and Eastern education is based on the Prussian education system.

In most countries today, full-time education, whether at school or otherwise, is compulsory for all children up to a certain age. Due to this the proliferation of compulsory education, combined with population growth, UNESCO has calculated that in the next 30 years more people will receive formal education than in all of human history thus far.

Development goals

Joseph Chimombo pointed out education's role as a policy instrument, capable of instilling social change and economic advancement in developing countries by giving communities the opportunity to take control of their destinies. The 2030 Agenda for Sustainable Development, adopted by the United Nations (UN) General Assembly in September 2015, calls for a new vision to address the environmental, social and economic concerns facing the world today. The Agenda includes 17 Sustainable Development Goals (SDGs), including SDG 4 on education.

Since 1909, the percentage of children in the developing world attending school has increased. Before then, a small minority of boys attended school. By the start of the twenty-first century, the majority of children in most regions of the world attended some form of school. By 2016, over 91 percent of children are enrolled in formal primary schooling. However, a learning crisis has emerged across the globe, due to the fact that a large proportion of students enrolled in school are not learning. A World Bank study found that "53 percent of children in low- and middle-income countries cannot read and understand a simple story by the end of primary school." While schooling has increased rapidly over the last few decades, learning has not followed suit.

Universal Primary Education was one of the eight international Millennium Development Goals, towards which progress has been made in the past decade, though barriers still remain. Securing charitable funding from prospective donors is one particularly persistent problem. Researchers at the Overseas Development Institute have indicated that the main obstacles to funding for education include conflicting donor priorities, an immature aid architecture, and a lack of evidence and advocacy for the issue. Additionally, Transparency International has identified corruption in the education sector as a major stumbling block to achieving Universal Primary Education in Africa. Furthermore, demand in the developing world for improved educational access is not as high as foreigners have expected. Indigenous governments are reluctant to take on the ongoing costs involved. There is also economic pressure from some parents, who prefer their children to earn money in the short term rather than work towards the long-term benefits of education.

A study conducted by the UNESCO International Institute for Educational Planning indicates that stronger capacities in educational planning and management may have an important spill-over effect on the system as a whole. Sustainable capacity development requires complex interventions at the institutional, organizational and individual levels that could be based on some foundational principles:
 national leadership and ownership should be the touchstone of any intervention;
 strategies must be context relevant and context specific;
 plans should employ an integrated set of complementary interventions, though implementation may need to proceed in steps;
 partners should commit to a long-term investment in capacity development while working towards some short-term achievements;
 outside intervention should be conditional on an impact assessment of national capacities at various levels;
 a certain percentage of students should be removed for improvisation of academics (usually practiced in schools, after tenth grade).

Internationalisation
Nearly every country now has universal primary education.

Similarities – in systems or even in ideas – that schools share internationally have led to an increase in international student exchanges. The European Socrates-Erasmus Programme facilitates exchanges across European universities. The Soros Foundation provides many opportunities for students from central Asia and eastern Europe. Programs such as the International Baccalaureate have contributed to the internationalization of education. The global campus online, led by American universities, allows free access to class materials and lecture files recorded during the actual classes.

The Programme for International Student Assessment and the International Association for the Evaluation of Educational Achievement objectively monitor and compare the proficiency of students from a wide range of different nations.

The internationalization of education is sometimes equated by critics with the westernization of education. These critics say that the internationalization of education leads to the erosion of local education systems and indigenous values and norms, which are replaced with Western systems and cultural and ideological values and orientation.

Technology in developing countries

Technology plays an increasingly significant role in improving access to education for people living in impoverished areas and developing countries. However, lack of technological advancement is still causing barriers with regards to quality and access to education in developing countries. Charities like One Laptop per Child are dedicated to providing infrastructures through which the disadvantaged may access educational materials.

The OLPC foundation, a group out of MIT Media Lab and supported by several major corporations, has a stated mission to develop a $100 laptop for delivering educational software. The laptops were widely available as of 2008. They are sold at cost or given away based on donations.

In Africa, the New Partnership for Africa's Development (NEPAD) has launched an "e-school program" to provide all 600,000 primary and high schools with computer equipment, learning materials and internet access within 10 years. An International Development Agency project called nabuur.com, started with the support of former American President Bill Clinton, uses the Internet to allow co-operation by individuals on issues of social development.

India is developing technologies that will bypass land-based telephone and Internet infrastructure to deliver distance learning directly to its students. In 2004, the Indian Space Research Organisation launched EDUSAT, a communications satellite providing access to educational materials that can reach more of the country's population at a greatly reduced cost.

Funding in developing countries
A survey of literature of the research into low-cost private schools (LCPS) found that over a five-year period ending in July 2013, debate around LCPSs to achieving Education for All (EFA) objectives was polarized and finding growing coverage in international policy. The polarization was due to disputes around whether the schools are affordable for the poor, reach disadvantaged groups, provide quality education, support or undermine equality, and are financially sustainable. The report examined the main challenges encountered by development organizations which support LCPSs. Surveys suggest these types of schools are expanding across Africa and Asia. This success is attributed to excess demand. These surveys found concern for:
 Equity: This concern is widely found in the literature, suggesting the growth in low-cost private schooling may be exacerbating or perpetuating already existing inequalities in developing countries, between urban and rural populations, lower- and higher-income families, and between girls and boys. The report findings suggest that girls may be under represented and that LCPS are reaching low-income families in smaller numbers than higher-income families.
 Quality and educational outcomes: It is difficult to generalize about the quality of private schools. While most achieve better results than government counterparts, even after their social background is taken into account, some studies find the opposite. Quality in terms of levels of teacher absence, teaching activity, and pupil to teacher ratios in some countries are better in LCPSs than in government schools.
 Choice and affordability for the poor: Parents can choose private schools because of perceptions of better-quality teaching and facilities, and an English language instruction preference. Nevertheless, the concept of 'choice' does not apply in all contexts, or to all groups in society, partly because of limited affordability (which excludes most of the poorest) and other forms of exclusion, related to caste or social status.
 Cost-effectiveness and financial sustainability: There is evidence that private schools operate at low cost by keeping teacher salaries low, and their financial situation may be precarious where they are reliant on fees from low-income households.

The report showed some cases of successful voucher where there was an oversupply of quality private places and an efficient administrative authority and of subsidy programs. Evaluations of the effectiveness of international support to the sector are rare. Addressing regulatory ineffectiveness is a key challenge. Emerging approaches stress the importance of understanding the political economy of the market for LCPS, specifically how relationships of power and accountability between users, government, and private providers can produce better education outcomes for the poor.

Theory

Pedagogy 

Pedagogy is often defined as the study or science of teaching methods. It investigates how the aims of education, like the transmission of knowledge or fostering skills and character traits, can be realized. It is particularly interested in the methods and practices used for teaching in regular schools and some researchers restrict it to this domain. But in a wider sense, it covers all types of education, including forms of teaching outside schools. In this general sense, it explores how teachers can bring about experiences in learners to advance their understanding of the studied topic and how the learning itself takes place.

A great variety of pedagogical theories is discussed in the academic literature. Mental-discipline theories date back all the way to ancient Greek. They see education as a form of training to help the learner improve their intellectual capacities. They often start from a certain ideal of what educated people should be like and formulate their teaching methods accordingly. Naturalist theories assume that there is already an inborn natural tendency in children to develop in a certain way. The teaching process is then organized in such a manner as to ensure that these tendencies and potentials are fully actualized. Herbartianism divides the educational process into different phases and investigates how to best realize each phase. The initial phase consists of preparation before the actual teaching happens. During the teaching itself, new ideas are first presented to the learner and then associated to ideas with which the learner is already familiar. In later phases, the understanding shifts to a more general level behind the specific instances and the ideas are then put into concrete practice. According to the international consortium known as the New London Group, there are four central components to pedagogy. In situated practice, learning takes place by practically engaging in real-life situations. Overt instruction is closer to classical forms of teaching and aims at helping the learner construct new knowledge based on their experiences and pre-existing knowledge. In critical framing, learners reflect on and critically analyze what they learned earlier. Transformed practice involves putting into practice what they learned previously, usually in new contexts and sometimes in the form of teaching others.

Various learning theories are also discussed in pedagogy. They try to understand how learning happens and propose teaching methods according to these findings. According to apperception or association theories, the mind is initially a blank slate and learns about the world by forming associations between ideas and experiences. Education tries to ensure that the right associations are formed. Behaviorism understands learning as a form of conditioning. This happens by presenting the learner with a stimulus, associating this stimulus with the desired response, and solidifying this stimulus-response pair.

There are many specific teaching methods available. Which one is most efficient in a particular case depends on various factors, like the subject matter as well as the learner's age and competence level. For this reason, students are often organized by age, competence, specialization, and native language into different classes and grades to ensure a productive learning process. Different subjects frequently use very different approaches: for example, methods focusing on verbal learning are common in language education while mathematical education is about abstract and symbolic thinking together with deductive reasoning. One central requirement for teaching methodologies is to make certain that the learner remains motivated, for example, because of interest and curiosity or through external rewards. Another component of many teaching methodologies is to include some form of test or assessment to ensure that the learner is making progress and to change the chosen method if necessary. An important pedagogical aspect in many forms of modern education is that each particular lesson is part of a larger educational enterprise governed by a syllabus, often covering several months or years. A further pedagogical factor concerns the instructional media used, such as books, worksheets, and audio-visual recordings as well as computer-assisted instruction.

Psychology

Educational psychology is the study of how humans learn in educational settings, the effectiveness of educational interventions, the psychology of teaching, and the social psychology of schools as organizations. The terms "educational psychology" and "school psychology" are often used interchangeably. Educational psychology is concerned with the processes of educational attainment in the general population and in sub-populations such as gifted children and those with specific disabilities.

Educational psychology can in part be understood through its relationship with other disciplines. It is informed primarily by psychology, bearing a relationship to that discipline analogous to the relationship between medicine and biology. Educational psychology, in turn, informs a wide range of specialties within educational studies, including instructional design, educational technology, curriculum development, organizational learning, special education and classroom management. Educational psychology both draws from and contributes to cognitive science and the learning sciences. In universities, departments of educational psychology are usually housed within faculties of education, possibly accounting for the lack of representation of educational psychology content in introductory psychology textbooks (Lucas, Blazek, & Raley, 2006).

Intelligence

Intelligence is an important factor in how the individual responds to education. Those who have higher scores of intelligence-metrics tend to perform better at school and go on to higher levels of education. This effect is also observable in the opposite direction, in that education increases measurable intelligence. Studies have shown that while educational attainment is important in predicting intelligence in later life, intelligence at 53 is more closely correlated to intelligence at 8 years old than to educational attainment.

Personal Development

Education can also be a useful tool in personal development. This can include activities such as learning new skills, creating a personal development plan (PDP), developing talents, creating human capital, developing spiritually, or improving self-knowledge. Even the action of teaching others can help improve oneself.

Learning modalities

There has been much interest in learning modalities and styles over the last two decades. The most commonly employed learning modalities are:
 Visual: learning based on observation and seeing what is being learned.
 Auditory: learning based on listening to instructions/information.
 Kinesthetic: learning based on movement, e.g. hands-on work and engaging in activities.

Other commonly employed modalities include musical, interpersonal, verbal, logical, and intrapersonal.

Dunn and Dunn focused on identifying relevant stimuli that may influence learning and manipulating the school environment, at about the same time as Joseph Renzulli recommended varying teaching strategies. Howard Gardner identified a wide range of modalities in his Multiple Intelligences theories. The Myers-Briggs Type Indicator and Keirsey Temperament Sorter, based on the works of Jung, focus on understanding how people's personality affects the way they interact personally, and how this affects the way individuals respond to each other within the learning environment. The work of David Kolb and Anthony Gregorc's Type Delineator follows a similar but more simplified approach.

Some theories propose that all individuals benefit from a variety of learning modalities, while others suggest that individuals may have preferred learning styles, learning more easily through visual or kinesthetic experiences. A consequence of the latter theory is that effective teaching should present a variety of teaching methods which cover all three learning modalities so that different students have equal opportunities to learn in a way that is effective for them. Guy Claxton has questioned the extent that learning styles such as Visual, Auditory and Kinesthetic(VAK) are helpful, particularly as they can have a tendency to label children and therefore restrict learning. Recent research has argued, "there is no adequate evidence base to justify incorporating learning styles assessments into general educational practice."

Mind, brain, and education
Educational neuroscience is an emerging scientific field that brings together researchers in cognitive neuroscience, developmental cognitive neuroscience, educational psychology, educational technology, education theory and other related disciplines to explore the interactions between biological processes and education. Researchers in educational neuroscience investigate the neural mechanisms of reading, numerical cognition, attention, and their attendant difficulties including dyslexia, dyscalculia, and ADHD as they relate to education. Several academic institutions around the world are beginning to devote resources to the establishment of educational neuroscience research.

Philosophy

As an academic field, philosophy of education is "the philosophical study of education and its problems its central subject matter is education, and its methods are those of philosophy". "The philosophy of education may be either the philosophy of the process of education or the philosophy of the discipline of education. That is, it may be part of the discipline in the sense of being concerned with the aims, forms, methods, or results of the process of educating or being educated; or it may be metadisciplinary in the sense of being concerned with the concepts, aims, and methods of the discipline." As such, it is both part of the field of education and a field of applied philosophy, drawing from fields of metaphysics, epistemology, axiology and the philosophical approaches (speculative, prescriptive or analytic) to address questions in and about pedagogy, education policy, and curriculum, as well as the process of learning, to name a few. For example, it might study what constitutes upbringing and education, the values and norms revealed through upbringing and educational practices, the limits and legitimization of education as an academic discipline, and the relation between education theory and practice.

Purpose
There is no broad consensus as to what education's chief aim or aims are or should be. Different places, and at different times, have used educational systems for different purposes. The Prussian education system in the 19th century, for example, wanted to turn boys and girls into adults who would serve the state's political goals.

Some authors stress its value to the individual, emphasizing its potential for positively influencing students' personal development, promoting autonomy, forming a cultural identity or establishing a career or occupation. Other authors emphasize education's contributions to societal purposes, including good citizenship, shaping students into productive members of society, thereby promoting society's general economic development, and preserving cultural values.

The purpose of education in a given time and place affects who is taught, what is taught, and how the education system behaves. For example, in the 21st century, many countries treat education as a positional good. In this competitive approach, people want their own students to get a better education than other students. This approach can lead to unfair treatment of some students, especially those from disadvantaged or marginalized groups. For example, in this system, a city's school system may draw school district boundaries so that nearly all the students in one school are from low-income families, and that nearly all the students in the neighboring schools come from more affluent families, even though concentrating low-income students in one school results in worse educational achievement for the entire school system.

Curriculum

In formal education, a curriculum is the set of courses and their content offered at a school or university. As an idea, curriculum stems from the Latin word for race course, referring to the course of deeds and experiences through which children grow to become mature adults. A curriculum is prescriptive and is based on a more general syllabus which merely specifies what topics must be understood and to what level to achieve a particular grade or standard.

An academic discipline is a branch of knowledge which is formally taught, either at the university – or via some other such method. Each discipline usually has several sub-disciplines or branches, and distinguishing lines are often both arbitrary and ambiguous. Examples of broad areas of academic disciplines include the natural sciences, mathematics, computer science, social sciences, humanities and applied sciences.

Instruction
Instruction is the facilitation of another's learning. Instructors in primary and secondary institutions are often called teachers, and they direct the education of students and might draw on many subjects like reading, writing, mathematics, science and history. Instructors in post-secondary institutions might be called teachers, instructors, or professors, depending on the type of institution; and they primarily teach only their specific discipline. Studies from the United States suggest that the quality of teachers is the single most important factor affecting student performance, and that countries which score highly on international tests have multiple policies in place to ensure that the teachers they employ are as effective as possible. With the passing of NCLB in the United States (No Child Left Behind), teachers must be highly qualified.

Economics

It has been argued that high rates of education are essential for countries to be able to achieve high levels of economic growth. Empirical analyses tend to support the theoretical prediction that poor countries should grow faster than rich countries because they can adopt cutting-edge technologies already tried and tested by rich countries. However, technology transfer requires knowledgeable managers and engineers who are able to operate new machines or production practices borrowed from the leader in order to close the gap through imitation. Therefore, a country's ability to learn from the leader is a function of its stock of "human capital". Recent study of the determinants of aggregate economic growth have stressed the importance of fundamental economic institutions and the role of cognitive skills.

At the level of the individual, there is a large literature, generally related to the work of Jacob Mincer, on how earnings are related to the schooling and other human capital. This work has motivated many studies, but is also controversial. The chief controversies revolve around how to interpret the impact of schooling. Some students who have indicated a high potential for learning, by testing with a high intelligence quotient, may not achieve their full academic potential, due to financial difficulties.

Economists Samuel Bowles and Herbert Gintis argued in 1976 that there was a fundamental conflict in American schooling between the egalitarian goal of democratic participation and the inequalities implied by the continued profitability of capitalist production.

Development

The world is changing at an ever quickening rate, which means that a lot of knowledge becomes obsolete and inaccurate more quickly. The emphasis is therefore shifting to teaching the skills of learning: to picking up new knowledge quickly and in as agile a way as possible. Finnish schools have begun to move away from the regular subject-focused curricula, introducing instead developments like phenomenon-based learning, where students study concepts like climate change instead. There are also active educational interventions to implement programs and paths specific to non-traditional students, such as first generation students.

Education is also becoming a commodity no longer reserved for children; adults need it too. Some governmental bodies, like the Finnish Innovation Fund Sitra in Finland, have proposed compulsory lifelong education.

Studies found that automation is likely to eliminate nearly half the jobs in developed countries during roughly the next two decades. Automation is therefore considered to be a major factor in a "race between education and technology". Automation technologies and their application may render certain currently taught skills and knowledge redundant while increasing the need for other curricula – such as material related to the application of automation. It has been argued that formal education is "teaching workers the wrong things, and that deep reform is essential to facilitate the development of digital knowledge and technical skills, as well as nonroutine cognitive and noncognitive (or "soft") skills" and that the formal state-organized education system – which is built on the Industrial Revolution model and focuses on IQ and memorization is losing relevance. Schools were found to rarely teach in forms of "learning by doing", and many children above a certain age "hate school" in terms of the material and subjects being taught, with much of it being a "waste of time" that gets forgotten quickly and is useless in modern society. Moreover, the material currently being taught may not be taught in a highly time-efficient manner and analyzing educational issues over time and using relevant forms of student feedback in efficiency analysis were found to be important. Some research investigates how education can facilitate students' interest in topics – and jobs – that scientific research, data, economic players, financial markets, and other economic mechanisms consider important to contemporary and future human civilization and states.

Research and data indicate future environmental conditions will be "far more dangerous than currently believed", with a review concluding that the current challenges that humanity faces are enormous. The effective resolval of such challenges may require novel lesson plans tailored towards skills and knowledge found to be both required and reasonable to be taught at the respective age with the respective methodology despite novel technological computation and information retrieval technologies such as smartphones, mathematical software and the World Wide Web. Environmental education is not widely taught extensively or facilitated while being potentially important to the protection and generation of – often unquantified – economic value such as clean air that agents of the economy can breathe. Education is often considered to be a national investment which may not always optimize for cost-efficiency while optimizing only in terms of contemporary economic value metrics or evaluations such as of finance and GDP without consideration of economic values or priorizations beyond these tools such as minimized marine pollution and maximized climate change mitigation. Researchers found that there is a growing disconnect between humans and nature and that schools "are not properly preparing students to become the scientists of tomorrow". They also find that critical thought, social responsibility, health and safety are often neglected. According to UNESCO, "for a country to meet the basic needs of its people, the teaching of science is a strategic imperative".

One example of a skill not commonly taught in formal education systems around the world but increasingly critical to both the individuals' lives and modern society at large is digital media literacy – the ability to access, analyze, evaluate, create, and act using all forms of modern ICTs, with scientists calling for inclusion of it in curricula as well as for adult education.

Studies have shown that active learning rarely applied in schools is highly efficacious. Studies found that massive open online courses offer a pathway to employment that currently bypasses conventional universities and their degree programs while often being more relevant to contemporary economic activities and the students' interests. Such online courses are not commonly part of formal education but are typically both completed and selected entirely on behalf of the student, sometimes with the support of peers over online forums. In contrast, blended learning merges online education with forms of face‐to‐face communication and traditional class-based education in classrooms, revealing itself to have the general capacity for increasingly relevant, resource-efficient and effective approaches to education. Deploying, using, and managing various tools or platforms for education typically imply an increase in economic investment. Expenses for education are often large with many calling for further increases. Potential policies for the development of international open source educational software using latest technologies may minimize costs, hardware requirements, problem-resolval efforts and deployment-times while increasing robustness, security and functional features of the software.

COVID-19 pandemic

Beginning in early 2020, the COVID-19 pandemic disrupted education systems throughout the world, affecting nearly 1.6 billion learners in more than 190 countries. Closures of schools and other learning spaces have impacted 94 percent of the world's student population, up to 99 percent in low and lower-middle income countries. Many schools made alternative plans during the pandemic, leading to a variety of in-person, hybrid, and online-only plans, which led to challenges for many students, teachers, and families including children with learning disabilities and those learning in a language that is not their native one. As of 30 September 2020 there were 27 countries that had localized school closures. In the United States, an estimated 55.1 million students were forced to cease in-person instruction as of 10 April 2020. A switch to a virtual learning experience is particularly challenging for families that cannot afford the proper technology, such as laptops, printers, or a reliable Internet connection. When schools close, parents are often asked to facilitate the learning of children at home and can struggle to perform this task. This is especially true for parents with limited education and resources. Students who require special education found it difficult to progress through the curriculum without tools and support that they require. Polling suggests that schools that serve a majority of students of color are far less likely to have access to the technology needed for remote learning. Only 66% of Black households in the U.S. had home broadband service in 2019. Only 45% of Black Americans owned a desktop or laptop computer in 2015. Without access to the internet or a computer, Black parents are at a disadvantage in educating their children. The mental health of students has been greatly impacted due to the pandemic. It is estimated that three in ten participating in school at home have had their emotional and mental health negatively impacted. Similarly, the social lives of students have also been upended and this has been detrimental to the health of students worldwide which has also negatively impacted educational quality. This will be an issue for years to come. COVID-19 has shone a light on opportunity gaps and it will be up to educators and policymakers to direct the necessary resources to mitigating them in the coming years.

As a human right

See also

Notes

References

Sources

 
 
 
 
 
 
 

Attribution

External links

 
 
 UNESCO Institute for Statistics: International comparable statistics on education systems
 World Bank Education
 Systems Approach for Better Education Results (SABER)
 Education Statistics (EdStats)
 OECD Education GPS: Statistics and policy analysis, interactive portal
 OECD Statistics
 IIEP Publications on Education Systems
 When Covid-19 closed schools, Black, Hispanic and poor kids took biggest hit in math, reading

 
Main topic articles